Espen Rud (born 29 January 1948 in Asker, Norway) is a Norwegian jazz musician (drums), composer, and music arranger, and the son of Norwegian author Nils Johan Rud (1908–93). He is known from numerous recordings and in collaboration with Karin Krog and Dexter Gordon, within Terje Rypdal's trio Min Bul, or the absurd musical theater of Svein Finnerud Trio.

Career 
Rud joined the fri jazz band Svein Finnerud Trio (1967–74), was educated at the Norges Musikkhøgskole (1968), was percussionist within Pompel og Pilt (1969), was part of Min bul (1970) in trio with Terje Rypdal and Bjørnar Andresen, and contributed on the Karin Krog album Some other spring (1970), where Dexter Gordon and Kenny Drew also contributed. He also played within the Ivar Antonsen Trio, and led his own Quartet together with Ivar Antonsen, Ditlef Eckhoff and Sture Janson, performing at Moldejazz in 1969.

In the 1980s he started an extensive collaboration with Rikskonsertene (1978–), lately with Hans Mathisen and Jens Fossum («Vi improviserer»). He participated within Chet Baker Quartet, on the release The improviser (1983) including Per Husby and Bjørn Kjellemyr, recorded at Club 7. He also led the band «Kråbøl» (1978–83), from which one can hear performances on his release Hotelsuite (1984), with the band including Rob Waring, Elin Rosseland, Tore Brunborg, Karin Krog and Vigleik Storaas. Rud was performing within New Cool Quartet (1980–89), and was awarded the Buddyprisen 1983.

In the 1990s, he was within a trio including Johannes Eick and Christian Wallumrød. He released the album Rudlende (1998) within his own Sextet «Rudlende», awarded  Spellemannprisen 1998 in the class Jazz (Tore Brunborg, Nils Jansen, Vigleik Storaas, Frode Nymo,  and Terje Gewelt). Rud was on the quartet releases by Ivar Antonsen, Terje Gewelt and Knut Riisnæs. Later he played with Staffan William-Olsson Trio, Magni Wentzel Sextet, and Halvard Kausland/Hans Mathisen.

On his latest solo album Dobbeldans (2011) he connects Jai Shankar's Indian tabla rhythms with Latin grooves, Rud's specialty, but also straight hard swing with a slight taste of Norwegian traditional folk music. For the album title Double Dance, there are a four double coverage.

 Asker kommune Culture Award 2022
Buddyprisen 1983
Spellemannprisen 1998 in the class Jazz, for the album Rudlende

Discography (in selection)

Solo albums 
1984: Hotelsuite (Odin Records)
1998: Rudlende (Taurus Records) within his own Sextet «Rudlende», awarded Spellemannprisen 1998
2011: Dobbeldans (Curling Legs - CLP CD 121)
2012: Løvsamleren (Curling Legs - CLP CD 127)
2014: Ukjend By (Curling Legs - CLP CD 136)
2017: Carla The Fish (Curling Legs)

As band leader 
1984: Hotelsuite (Odin Records), within his Sextet «Kråbøl»

Collaborative works 
Within Svein Finnerud Trio
1970: Svein Finnerud Trio (Norsk Jazzforum)
1970: Plastic Sun (Sonet Music)
1970: Travel Pillow (Prisma Records)
2008: The Complete Released Works 1968-1999 (Plastic Strip)

With other projects
1970: Min bul (EmArcy 2003), within Terje Rypdal's Trio Min Bul
1978: Høysang (NorDisc), within Guttorm Guttormsen Quintet feat. Lars Klevstrand
1983: The improviser (Cadence Jazz Records), within the Chet Baker Quartet, including Per Husby & Bjørn Kjellemyr, recorded at Club 7
2012: Prøysen goes jazz (Curling Legs - CLP CD 124), within «Fire fyrer» (additional Torbjørn Sunde, Frode Kjekstad & Sigurd Hole)
With Chet Baker
The Improviser (Cadence Jazz, 1983)
With Karin Krog and Dexter Gordon
Some Other Spring (Sonet, 1970)

References

External links 
Thomas Strøonen Official Website

1948 births
Living people
Musicians from Asker
Norwegian Academy of Music alumni
20th-century Norwegian drummers
21st-century Norwegian drummers
Norwegian jazz drummers
Male drummers
Norwegian jazz composers
Spellemannprisen winners
Taurus Records artists
20th-century drummers
Male jazz composers
20th-century Norwegian male musicians
21st-century Norwegian male musicians